Gyanesh Sharma (born 28 February 1963) is currently serving as the Chairman of Chhattisgarh Yog Aayog, also a senior Corporator from Thakur Pyarelal Ward 40 and Chairman of Public Works Department (PWD) in Raipur Municipal Corporation and also is a senior spokesperson and senior leader of Chhattisgarh State Congress Committee and has served as the Chairman of the Media Department in State Congress Committee of Chhattisgarh. He is also the Chairman of Vipra Arts, commerce & physical education college society.

References

Raipur, Chhattisgarh
1963 births
Living people
Indian politicians